Gahar Zagros Football Club (former named by Damash Lorestan) is an Iranian professional football club based in Dorood, Lorestan. Founded in 2006, the club competes in the 2nd Division.

History

Establishment in Tehran
Damash Iranian were set up in July 2006 in Tehran by a private investor and played in Iran Football's 2nd Division for one season before being promoted to Azadegan League.

Azadegan League
Competing in Group A of Azadegan League season 2007/08, Damash managed to start well in the tournament, sharing the top of the league with Shahrdari Bandar Abbas.

Hazfi Cup
In the 2006/07 Hazfi Cup Damash managed to knock out IPL side F.C. Zob Ahan 5–4 on penalty kicks in the round of 32, progressing to the round of 16 where they met Bargh Shiraz F.C. and lost 5–4 on penalties. This was a major achievement for the club in its first season in the Iranian football league system.
Damash entered the next season of Hazfi Cup in the Third Round Proper and were eliminated by Steel Azin on penalties.

Establishment of Damash Lorestan
Damash Lorestan was formed as a result of the dissolution of Damash Tehran on July 9, 2008. Damash moved to city of Dorood and was renamed Gahar Zagros.

Gahar Zagros
In June 2011, the football club changed its name from Damash Lorestan to Gahar Zagros. In 2011/2012 Davoud Mahabadi was signed as coach and led Gahar Zagros to Iran Pro League, by finishing second in Azadegan League and thanks to playoff victory against Iranjavan F.C. This is the first time in team and Lorestan Province history that it had reached the top tier of Iranian football. Unfortunately the following year the club was relegated back to the Azadegan League. The following year the club was relegated to the 2nd Division.

Seasons

Club managers
 Reza Shahroudi (2006–07)
 Amir Hossein Peyrovani (2007–08)
 Hamid Alidoosti (2008)
 Human Afazeli (2008–09)
 Markar Aghajanian (2009)
 Darko Dražić (2010–11)
 Amir Hossein Peyrovani (2011)
 Davoud Mahabadi (2011–12)
 Mehdi Tartar (June 2012 – Sept 12)
 Mohammad Mayeli Kohan (Oct 2012 – May 13)
 Mohammad Ahmadzadeh (Aug 2013 – Jan 14)
 Alireza Delikhon (Jan 2014–1 March 14)

References

See also
 Hazfi Cup
 2011–12 Azadegan League
 Damash Gilan
 Parseh Tehran

Football clubs in Iran
Association football clubs established in 2006
Lorestan Province
2006 establishments in Iran